Football in Croatia is the country's most popular sport. The Croatian Football Federation (HNS) is the governing body and is responsible for overseeing all aspects of association football in the nation, both professional and amateur. The national and club teams are governed by UEFA in Europe and FIFA in global competitions. The history of the sport is delineated by a variety of unofficial sides as Croatia was not an independent entity until the late 20th century.

The club teams that compete domestically do so in the top flight, the Croatian Football League (Hrvatska nogometna liga), the second-tier, First Football League (Prva NL), the third-tier, Second Football League (Druga NL), and fourth-tier Third Football League (Treća NL). The counties of Croatia likewise compete in a regional league system. Club teams contest their respective league championships, the Croatian Cup, and the Croatian Super Cup. The two largest club teams are Dinamo Zagreb and Hajduk Split, who share a rivalry. 

The national team of Croatia is a major sporting franchise in European and international football. They have qualified for every major tournament with the exception of Euro 2000 and the 2010 World Cup, reaching the quarter-finals of the UEFA European Championship twice (1996, 2008) and the semi-finals of the UEFA Nations League in 2023. At the FIFA World Cup, Croatia has finished second once (2018) and third on two occasions (1998, 2022), securing three World Cup medals.

History 

The earliest record of football in Croatia dates from 1873, when English engineers and technicians of Stabilimento tecnico Fiumano played in Rijeka against the engineers building the local railway line, with local Fiumans also taking part in the game.  The first recorded football match played in the Kingdom of Croatia was played in 1880 in Županja, between English workers of The Oak Extract Company and local youths. In 1890 the first school-based football clubs are founded by high school students in Rijeka. The sport was further popularized in Croatia by Franjo Bučar in the 1890s. The Croatian translation of the sport's name, nogomet, was coined by the linguist Slavko Rutzner Radmilović in 1893 or 1894. The name was accepted into Slovenian as well.

The earliest officially registered association football clubs were founded in Pula before the turn of the century, when in August 1899 the locals founded Club Iris and later in the same year Veloce Club, both multi-sport association that had also very popular football sections. The first clubs to be founded in the then Kingdom of Croatia-Slavonia per se were HAŠK and PNIŠK, in 1903. In Rijeka the Hungarian-leaning Fiumei Atletikai Club was founded in 1905 and the multicultural CS Olimpia already in 1904, but Olimpia's football section may have held its first seating only in 1906, something that is still debated among historians. That same year the Giovine Fiume club was founded by the Italian irredentist youth of the city and HŠK Concordia started its activities in Zagreb.

Among the other earliest clubs also Victoria and Olimpija Karlovac were created in 1908. In 1908 also the first win of Croatian city-based club against an English side is recorded when CS Olimpia beats 1-0 the official football team of the Cunard Line ship RMS Brescia. In 1909 GŠK Marsonia started playing in Slavonski Brod and Rijeka's then strongest side Fiumei AC was invited to play officially in the Hungarian Championship, but it decides not to. The same year Segesta officially appears for the first time in Sisak.

In 1910 the club Forza e Coraggio was founded in Dubrovnik and the Società Ginnastica e Scherma in Zadar opens officially its football section, and these will battle in the first Dalmatian Championship in 1911, won by Forza e Coraggio before being forced by the country's authorities to change its name into U.S. Ragusa. Hajduk, Građanski and SK Opatija were all founded in the same year, 1911. The first football club to be founded purely by Croats was Bačka in Subotica in 1901, in what was then the Kingdom of Hungary and is today Serbia. In Bosnia and Herzegovina Zrinjski Mostar was founded by Croats in 1905 and was the first club to be founded in that country. The Croatian Football Federation (HNS) itself was created in 1912 which is also the year of the first Croatia and Slavonia championship, won by HAŠK. In 1912 the Dalmatian championship is won by Società Bersaglieri and in its third edition is won by Calcio Spalato, who then played and lost to the best club from the Trieste region, Edera.

After World War I, Croats played a major part in the founding of the first football federation of the Kingdom of Serbs, Croats and Slovenes, later named Football Association of Yugoslavia. Its headquarters were initially in Zagreb before moving to Belgrade in 1929. These were the times when great talents like Ico Hitrec dominated the national fields. In 1927, Hajduk Split took part in the inaugural Mitropa Cup, a tournament dedicated to the best Central European clubs.

Croatia itself played its first international football match as a representative team of the Banovina in a match held on April 2, 1940 against Switzerland. During World War II, the Croatian Football Federation joined FIFA as a representative of the Independent State of Croatia, but this was contentious and short-lived as was the fascist puppet-state of which it was part. After the war, football was resumed within the institutional framework of the second Yugoslavia. The communist regime in the new state quickly moved to apply a damnatio memoriae to all club names and brands involved in the Croatian or Italian championships or that bore clear Croatian or Italian national names. The communist regime in Belgrade justified the rearrangement of all local football clubs with its plan to copy the stalinist model of athletic organisation, merging all local clubs into omni-comprehensive sport unions – often forcing local institutions and party representatives to enact a heavy rebranding of the local clubs identities, to make it more in line with the communist goals and ideals.

Following this policies, Građanski was rebranded into NK Dinamo Zagreb, U.S. Fiumana (how CS Olimpia was rebranded by the Italian fascist regime) became S.C.F. Quarnero in Yugoslavia, ŽŠK Victoria became NK Lokomotiva in Zagreb, and dozens of others less famous clubs followed the same rebranding fate. Most clubs had henceforth to explicitly display loyalty to the new regime, and it was common for them to feature the communist red star as part of a new emblem, often paired with proletarian sounding and appealing identities. Among the victims of these changes, some clubs got completely disbanded, including top sides Concordia, PNIŠK and HAŠK, as well as major Croatian ethnic clubs in today's Bosnia and Herzegovina SAŠK and HŠK Zrinjski Mostar. One of the very few large Croatian clubs that avoided rebranding altogether was Hajduk Split, who had refused to participate in the fascist Croatian competition and had strong links with the partizan army of Tito.

As Tito broke up with Stalin, in the '50s most sport unions reverted back to being only football clubs. Over the following decades, the Croatian clubs performed well in the Yugoslav First League and the Yugoslav Cup. Hajduk and Dinamo formed one half of the Big Four of Yugoslav football (the other two being FK Partizan and Red Star Belgrade). Rijeka won 2 Yugoslav cups. In 1967, Zlatko Čajkovski of German club Bayern Munich became the only Croatian manager to win the European Cup Winners' Cup. After Croatia gained independence in the 1990s, the football federation was reconstituted and joined the international associations. The Croatian internationals from the 1987 FIFA World Youth Championship-winning team went on to achieve more success, spawning the "golden generation" who finished third place at the 1998 FIFA World Cup. Since then, Croatia has continued to produce top players. At the more recent Euro 2008, they famously beat 2006 FIFA World Cup bronze medalists Germany 2–1 in a shock win but exited the tournament courtesy of a penalty shoot-out against Turkey in the quarterfinals. The national team finished third in the 2022 World Cup, after a 2–1 win over Morocco.

Earliest clubs in Croatia

Clubs in European competitions

Hajduk Split is the only Croatian club to date—either during the Yugoslav period or since independence—to have played in the knockout stages of the European Cup or UEFA Champions League, having reached the quarter-finals on three occasions (in 1975–76, 1979–80 and 1994–95).
Dinamo Zagreb have qualified for the Champions League group stage on eight occasions (in 1998–99, 1999–2000, 2011–12, 2012–13, 2015–16, 2016–17, 2019–20 and 2022–23) but have yet to progress further.
Both Dinamo and Hajduk have advanced past the round of sixteen of the UEFA Cup or UEFA Europa League, Hajduk played in the semi-finals in 1983–84 and the quarterfinals in 1985–86. They also reached the UEFA Cup's last sixteen in 1981–82 and 1986–87, while Dinamo Zagreb reached the quarterfinals in 2020–21 and the last sixteen in 1997–98 and 2018–19.
Dinamo Zagreb had success winning the Inter-Cities Fairs Cup in 1967 which is the only European trophy won by Croatian clubs. Dinamo also reached the final four years earlier in 1963 but suffered a loss to Valencia. In 1970–71 season, they reached third round. Croatian clubs also had success in the defunct UEFA Cup Winners' Cup. Both Dinamo Zagreb (1960–61) and Hajduk Split (1972–73) reached the semi-finals of the competitions. Dinamo have also reached the quarterfinals in 1964–65 and 1969–70, while Hajduk were eliminated at that stage in 1977–78. UEFA Cup Winners' Cup is also the only European competition that has seen Croatian clubs other than Dinamo and Hajduk reach the advanced stages. Rijeka reached the quarterfinals in the 1979–80 edition, while Varteks advanced to the quarterfinals in 1998–99, the last edition of the competition.

Best results
The table below lists Croatian clubs' best results in elimination rounds of European club competitions:

Footballers in international club competitions
The following table lists all Croatian players who are credited to win an international final (either appeared in the final, being unused substitutes or were in the squad in earlier rounds of the tournament). It does not include Croatians who were considered Yugoslav players prior to Croatia's independence in 1991.

As of 2022 a total of eleven Croatian players are credited as winning the Champions League: Alen Bokšić, Zvonimir Boban, Davor Šuker, Dario Šimić, Igor Bišćan, Mario Mandžukić, Luka Modrić, Ivan Rakitić, Mateo Kovačić, Dejan Lovren and Ivan Perišić, although Šimić, Bišćan and Lovren did not appear in the finals. In terms of appearances, fourteen players have played in the final (Bokšić, Boban, Šuker, Boris Živković, Marko Babić, Igor Tudor, Dado Pršo, Ivica Olić, Mandžukić, Modrić, Rakitić, Lovren, Perišić and Kovačić), but only five players appeared more than once – Bokšić (1993, 1997), Boban (1994, 1995), Olić (2010, 2012), Mandžukić (2013, 2017) and Modrić (2014, 2016, 2017, 2018, 2022). Two Croatian players have scored a goal in the final match, Mandžukić in the 2013 and 2017 final, and Rakitić in the 2015 final.

As of 2022 a total of eight Croatian players are credited as winning the Europa League: Mario Stanić, Ivica Olić, Ivica Križanac, Darijo Srna, Ivan Rakitić, Šime Vrsaljko, Mateo Kovačić and Kristijan Jakić – although Stanić did not appear for his club in the final. The only Croatian player to have scored a goal in the final match was Nikola Kalinić in the 2015 final.

Format
The governing body of football in Croatia is the Croatian Football Federation. It oversees the organization of:

 Leagues:
 HNL
 Prva NL
 Druga NL
 Treća NL
 Regional leagues
 Cup tournaments:
 Croatian Cup
 Croatian Supercup
 National teams:
 Croatia national football team
 Croatia national under-21 football team
 Croatia national under-19 football team
 Croatia national under-17 football team
 Croatia women's national football team

Seasons
The following articles detail major results and events in each footballing season since the early 1990s, when the Croatian First Football League was established. Each article provides final league standings for that season, as well as details on cup results, Croatia national football team results, and a summary of any other important events during the season.

Teams

According to many surveys conducted by multiple newspapers, the most popular club in Croatia is Dinamo Zagreb which is also the most successful club. Their main rivals are Hajduk Split, followed by HNK Rijeka and NK Osijek.

Futsal
Futsal, called mali nogomet (lit. "small football") in Croatia, is also widely played and is sometimes considered as a mini football league. It is often taught in schools and also played by football professionals as a pastime.

The Croatian First League of Futsal is the top-tier futsal competition where majority of Croatia national futsal team is selected.

There are also national competitions in other minifootball versions.

Fans

The Croatian football fans organize in various fan groups such as the Torcida (Hajduk), Bad Blue Boys (Dinamo), Armada (Rijeka), Kohorta (Osijek), etc.

On the international games, the Croatian fans usually wear the checkerboard colors red and white, as they are on the Croatian coat of arms.

See also

 Croatian football league system
 First Croatian beach soccer league

References

Sources

External links
 League321.com – Croatian football league tables, records & statistics database.